Nītārtha Institute is a school of advanced Buddhist studies for Western students designed based upon the traditional Tibetan monastic university curriculum. Its teachers include the published translator Karl Brunnholzl, as well as the head of Nalandabodhi, The Dzogchen Ponlop Rinpoche.

Notes

External links
 Nitartha Institute Home
 Nitartha International Home

Buddhist organizations based in the United States
Buddhism in Washington (state)
Tibetan Buddhist organizations